Boris Becker was the defending champion but did not compete that year.

Ivan Lendl won in the final 4–6, 6–3, 6–4 against Christo van Rensburg.

Seeds

  Ivan Lendl (champion)
  Stefan Edberg (first round)
  Mats Wilander (quarterfinals)
  Tim Mayotte (second round)
  Kevin Curren (second round)
  Amos Mansdorf (first round)
  Darren Cahill (second round)
  Christo van Rensburg (final)
  Alexander Volkov (first round)
  John Fitzgerald (third round)
  Mark Woodforde (second round)
  Paul Annacone (semifinals)
  Patrik Kühnen (first round)
  Derrick Rostagno (semifinals)
  Eric Jelen (third round)
  Wally Masur (third round)

Draw

Finals

Top half

Section 1

Section 2

Bottom half

Section 3

Section 4

External links
 1989 Stella Artois Championships draw

Singles